Marisa Merlini (6 August 1923 – 27 July 2008) was an Italian character actress active in Italy's post-World War II cinema. Merlini appeared in over fifty films during her career, which spanned from World War II to 2005. In Luigi Comencini's 1953 film Pane, amore e fantasia, she portrayed Annarella, a village midwife, who marries the local police marshal, played by Vittorio De Sica.

Biography
A native of Rome, where she was born on 6 August 1923, Merlini was well known for playing the romana verace, or "born-and-bred Roman" characters. Merlini also appeared in several high-profile comedic films alongside Italian actor, Totò, as well as the 1960 film Il vigile with actor Alberto Sordi. Additionally, Merlini appeared in a number of films opposite her real life friend, Italian actress Anna Magnani.

Merlini's awards included the Nastro d'Argento (Silver Ribbon), a film critics' award in 1957 for portraying a tourist in the 1956 Antonio Racioppi directed film, Tempo di Villeggiatura.

Merlini's last appearance on screen came in the 2005 film, La seconda notte di nozze, which was directed by Pupi Avati.

Marisa Merlini died in Rome, on 27 July 2008, at the age of 83. Director Pupi Avati, who directed Merlini's final 2005 film, La seconda notte di nozze, paid tribute to Merlini saying, "Marisa brought to the set the experience of somebody who had taken part in the golden years of Italian cinema, but she was down-to-earth both in front of and behind the camera... Working with her was an honour and a fantastic experience."

Filmography

 Stasera niente di nuovo (1942) - Un ospite dell'istituto
 Roma, città libera (1946) - Mara
 Toto Looks for a House (1949) - Patronessa
 The Emperor of Capri (1949) - La baronesa von Krapfen
 Marechiaro (1949) - Un' invitata al pranzo di nozze
 Se fossi deputato (1949) - Olga Olghis
 Vivere a sbafo (1949)
 Love and Poison (1950) - Orsola
 Toto Looks for a Wife (1950) - Luisa, la modella
 Lo Zappatore (1950)
 The Black Captain (1951) - Lucrezia Adinolfi
 Rome-Paris-Rome (1951) - Signora nel vagone letto
 Stasera sciopero (1951) - Gemma
 Napoleon (1951) - Giuseppina Beauharnais
 The Two Sergeants (1951)
 Viva il cinema! (1952) - Jacqueline
 I'm the Hero (1952) - Lucille
 The Passaguai Family Gets Rich (1952) - La contessa
 Ergastolo (1952) - Jeannette
 In Olden Days (1952) - La signora nell'auto scoperta 
 The Angels of the District (1952) - Gianna
 Sunday Heroes (1952) - Lucy - Cerchio's wife
 I, Hamlet (1952) - Regina Gertrud
 Il tallone d'Achille (1952) - Zizì
Er fattaccio (1952) - Lulù
 Cats and Dogs (1952) - Donna Filomena
 Infame accusa (1953) - Amante di Giovannino
 I Always Loved You (1953) - Lucia
 Bread, Love and Dreams (1953) - Anna Mirziato
 Viva il cinema! (1953)
 Tormento d'anime (1953)
 Sua Altezza ha detto: no! (1953) - Liubitza
 Finalmente libero! (1953) - Woman in the Court
 Anna perdonami (1953)
 La prigioniera di Amalfi (1954)
 Bread, Love and Jealousy (1954) - La levatrice
 The Lovers of Manon Lescaut (1954) - Elisa
 Due lacrime (1954) - Valeria
Di qua, di là del Piave (1954)
 Le signorine dello 04 (1955) - Vera Colasanti
 The Song of the Heart (1955) - Silvia
 Destination Piovarolo (1955) - Sara
 Cortile (1955)
 Il bigamo (1956) - Enza Masetti
 Tempo di villeggiatura (1956) - Margherita Pozzi
 Porta un bacione a Firenze (1956) - Sig.ra Rosa
 Padri e figli (1957) - Ines Santarelli
 The Most Wonderful Moment (1957) - Margherita Rosati
 Liane, die weiße Sklavin (1957) - Schwester
 Doctor and the Healer (1957) - Mafalda
 Husbands in the City (1957) - Aida
 Vacanze a Ischia (1957)
 Dinanzi a noi il cielo (1957) - Madre di Tom
Ladro lui, ladra lei (1958) - Marialele
 Io, mammeta e tu (1958) - Donna Amalia, la madre
 Resurrection (1958) - Bockowa
 Il bacio del sole (Don Vesuvio) (1958) - Carmela Spada
 Everyone's in Love (1959) - Jolanda
World of Miracles (1959) - Franca
La cento chilometri (1959) - Angela
 Juke box urli d'amore (1959) - Marisa Loreto
 Roulotte e roulotte (1959) - Anna
 I piaceri dello scapolo (1960) - Evelina
 Il carro armato dell'8 settembre (1960) - Palmira
 La garçonnière (1960) - Pupa
 Il vigile (1960) - Amalia Celletti
 Ferragosto in bikini (1960) - Marta
 Le ambiziose (1961) - La signora Letizia Proietti
 World in My Pocket (1961) - Frau Mandini
 Gli incensurati (1961) - Olimpia
 Akiko (1961) - Ottavia Colasanto
 Il giudizio universale (1961) - Mother of tomato-throwing child
 Liane, die Tochter des Dschungels (1961)
 His Women (1961) - Amalia
 Mariti a congresso (1961)
 Fra' Manisco cerca guai (1961) - Carmela
 Nerone '71 (1962)
 La Vendetta (1962) - La postière
 Colpo gobbo all'italiana (1962) - Nunziata Maggiola
 Le massaggiatrici (1962) - Bice Petroni
 Destination Rome (1963) - Pia
 I mostri (1963) - Paola Fioravanti (segment "Testimone volontario")
 La chica del trébol (1963)
 Crucero de verano (1964) - Carolina
 Ragazza in prestito (1964) - Regina
 Squillo (1964)
 Loca juventud (1965) - Madre de Johnny
 La fabbrica dei soldi (1965) - Ermelina
 Les combinards (1966) - Rosaria
 Io, io, io... e gli altri (1966) - Lady on the telephone
 The Peking Medallion (1967) - Madame Vulcano
 All Mad About Him (1967) - Allegra
 Gli altri, gli altri... e noi (1967)
 Donne, botte e bersaglieri (1968) - Mrs Jole
 Il grande silenzio (1968) - Regina
 Lisa dagli occhi blu (1970) - Moglie del Telegrafista
 Dramma della gelosia – Tutti i particolari in cronaca (1970)  - Silvana Ciafrocchi
 Ninì Tirabusciò: la donna che inventò la mossa (1970) - Ciccio's Assistant / Arab Dancer
 Mio padre Monsignore (1971) - Tosca
 Non commettere atti impuri (1972) - Maria Teresa's mother
 Continuavano a chiamarli i due piloti più matti del mondo (1972) - Signora Cesire
 Il maschio ruspante (1972) - Mother Giustina / Marcella - the prostitute
 A pugni nudi (1974) - Amalia, Paolo's Mother
 L'albero dalle foglie rosa (1974)
 Les bidasses s'en vont en guerre (1974) - Paulette Brugnon
 Le dolci zie (1975) - Fiorella
 Oh, Serafina! (1976) - Belinda Valle
 Stangata in famiglia (1976) - Aida
 Batton Story (1976) - Zaira
 La Bidonata (1977) - Maria
 La mazzetta (1978) - Elena Miletti
 Una bella governante di colore (1978) - Aspasia - wife of Nicola
 La moglie in vacanza... l'amante in città (1980) - Valeria's Mother
 L'altra donna (1980) - Olga's Mother
 Mia moglie torna a scuola (1980) - La preside
 L'onorevole con l'amante sotto il letto (1981) - Virginia Battistoni
 Cornetti alla crema (1981) - Zaira, Marianna's Mother
 Pierino contro tutti (1981) - La chiromante
 Il tifoso, l'arbitro e il calciatore (1982) - Mother of Manuela
 Storia d'amore e d'amicizia (1982, TV Mini-Series) - Garibalda
 Gian Burrasca (1982) - Zia Bettina
 Sfrattato cerca casa equo canone (1983) - Moglie di Maciste
 Arrivano i miei (1983)
 Mutande pazze (1992) - Aunt of Alessia
 Ricky & Barabba (1992) - Barabba's mother
 A Dio piacendo (1995) - Ileana
 Stella's Favor (1996) - Amelia
 Vacanze sulla neve (1999) - Countess Eloisa
 Pazzo d'amore(1999)
 Le ali della vita (2000, TV Movie) - Sorella Adele
 Teste di cocco (2000) - Nonna
 Reisei to jônetsu no aida (2001) - Gina
 Le ali della vita 2 (2003, TV Movie)
 La seconda notte di nozze'' (2005) - Eugenia Ricci

References

1923 births
2008 deaths
Italian film actresses
Actresses from Rome
Nastro d'Argento winners
20th-century Italian actresses
People of Lazian descent